The 1973 Camel GT season was the 3rd season of the IMSA GT Championship auto racing series.  It was for Grand Tourer-style racing cars which ran in the GTO and GTU classes, as well as former Trans Am Series cars in the TO and TU classes.  It began March 24, 1973, and ended November 25, 1973, after ten rounds. This year marked the decline of Trans Am and the beginning of it and IMSA GT becoming nigh indistinguishable.

Schedule
Some events were run twice, with each running counting as one round.

Season results
Overall winner in bold.

External links
 World Sports Racing Prototypes - 1973 IMSA GT Championship results

IMSA GT Championship seasons
IMSA GT